The neper (symbol: Np) is a logarithmic unit for ratios of measurements of physical field and power quantities, such as gain and loss of electronic signals. The unit's name is derived from the name of John Napier, the inventor of logarithms. As is the case for the decibel and bel, the neper is a unit defined in the international standard ISO 80000. It is not part of the International System of Units (SI), but is accepted for use alongside the SI.

Definition
Like the decibel, the neper is a unit in a logarithmic scale. While the bel uses the decadic (base-10) logarithm to compute ratios, the neper uses the natural logarithm, based on Euler's number. The level a ratio of two signal amplitudes or root-power quantities, with the unit neper, is given by

The level  of a ratio of two power quantities, with the unit neper, is given by

Units

The neper is defined in terms of ratios of field quantities — also called root-power quantities — (for example, voltage or current amplitudes in electrical circuits, or pressure in acoustics), whereas the decibel was originally defined in terms of power ratios.  A power ratio 10 log r dB is equivalent to a field-quantity ratio 20 log r dB, since power in a linear system is proportional to the square (Joule's laws) of the amplitude.  Hence the decibel and the neper have a fixed ratio to each other:

and

The (voltage) level ratio is

Like the decibel, the neper is a dimensionless unit. The International Telecommunication Union (ITU) recognizes both units. Only the neper is coherent with the SI.

Applications
The neper is a natural linear unit of relative difference, meaning in nepers (logarithmic units) relative differences add rather than multiply. This property is shared with logarithmic units in other bases, such as the bel.

The derived units decineper (1 dNp = 0.1 neper) and centineper (1 cNp = 0.01 neper) are also used. The centineper for root-power quantities corresponds to a log point or log percentage, see .

See also 
Nat (unit)

References

Works

Further reading

External links 
What's a neper?
Conversion of level gain and loss: neper, decibel, and bel
Calculating transmission line losses

Units of measurement
Logarithmic scales of measurement